Farhang-e-Asifiya  is an Urdu-to-Urdu dictionary compiled by Syed Ahmad Dehlvi. It has more than 60,000 entries in four volumes. It was first published in May, 1908 by Lahore Matba Rifah-i 'Am.

History 
It was compiled from 1868 to 1898. This dictionary is believed to be the most comprehensive work of Urdu lexicon.

Lexicography 
There were Urdu dictionaries before this, but they described Urdu vocable either in Persian or in English (because of the emergence of British Raj). These dictionaries contained mostly common words and idioms and had limited extent. This was the first Urdu-to-Urdu dictionary. During its compilation, Syed Dehlvi’s health worsened and he got into monetary issues. It was only completed with the support of the ruler of Deccan, Mir Mehboob Ali Khan.

References 

Dictionaries
Urdu-language books
20th-century Indian books
Urdu-language non-fiction literature
Urdu-language encyclopedias